Warszawa Wileńska is a railway station located in the eastern borough of Praga Północ in Warsaw, Poland. It serves mostly local and suburban trains run by Masovian Railways (Polish: Koleje Mazowieckie).

History
The Petersburg Train Station was built in 1863 as the final terminus of a new railroad linking Warsaw with Vilnius and St. Petersburg. The building itself was designed by Narcyz Zborzewski. As the line used Russian gauge while another major railway line operating in Warsaw at the time (namely the Warsaw–Vienna Railway) used Standard gauge, the two could not have been connected. To allow passengers travelling from Vienna to St. Petersburg easier access to both terminals a horse-drawn tramway line was opened soon after the railway line's completion, thus giving birth to Warsaw's tramway network. The original train station had been blown up by withdrawing Russian troops in 1915 during World War I.

After the end of hostilities and the Polish-Bolshevik War parts of the Warsaw–Saint Petersburg Railway between Warsaw and Vilnius were converted to standard gauge while passenger traffic between Warsaw and then-Soviet Leningrad practically ceased. Because of that the name of the station was changed to the one used currently. The position initially occupied by the 19th century train station which was demolished during the war was occupied by the new office building headquarters of Polish State Railways, constructed between 1927 and 1928. At the same time a new provisional Warszawa Wileńska station was constructed across the street, slightly to the south from the original location.

The new provisional building survived World War II when it was dismantled while old railway depots were converted to a station building. This building was also provisional, but survived in its role until 2000, when a new station was constructed. The ground floor houses a suburban train station operated currently by Koleje Mazowieckie, while upper floors house a shopping mall. The building was completed in 2002. The construction of a Warsaw Metro line 2 station Dworzec Wileński was completed in March 2015.

External links
 

Railway stations in Poland opened in 1863
Wilenska
Railway stations served by Koleje Mazowieckie